HK Olimp/Venta 2002 are a Latvian ice hockey team that plays in the Optibet Hockey League, the top tier of the sport in Latvia. The team is based in Riga and play their home games at the Inbox Ice Arena.

History
HK Olimp was founded in 2018, and the following year joined the Optibet Hockey League where they were immediately considered to be dark horses for the championship, due to have several Latvian national team members as part of their roster, including Georgijs Pujacs and Aleksejs Širokovs, both of whom also had KHL significant experience. The dark horse appellation turned out to be prescient as the team were in 1st place in their inaugural season, before the play-offs were cancelled due to the COVID-19 pandemic. During the off-season, the team partnered with junior side Venta 2002, and as a result rebranded as HK Olimp/Venta 2002. 

As a result of 1st place finish when the season was cancelled, Olimp qualified for the 2020–21 IIHF Continental Cup where they were scheduled to face-off in Group E against Shakhtyor Soligorsk of Belarus, Slovenian team Olimpija Ljubljana and the winner of Group B (made up of Crvena Zvezda Belgrade of Serbia, Mladost Zagreb from Croatia, Bulgarian side Irbis-Skate Sofia and Turkish outfit Buz Beykoz Istanbul). However, two months later, the IIHF cancelled the Continental Cup due to the Pandemic.

Roster 
Updated February 11, 2021.

Season-by-season record
Note: GP = Games played, W = Wins, L = Losses, T = Ties, OTL = Overtime losses, Pts = Points, GF = Goals for, GA = Goals against, PIM = Penalties in minutes

Team records

Career
These are the top five scorers in HK Olimpa history.

''Note: Pos = Position; GP = Games played; G = Goals; A = Assists; Pts = Points

Penalty minutes: Aleksejs Širokovs, 101

Season

Regular season 
 Most goals in a season: Nikolajs Jeļisejevs, 19 (2019-20)
 Most assists in a season: Emīls Ezītis, 20 (2020-21)
 Most points in a season: Nikolajs Jeļisejevs, 36 (2019-20)
 Most penalty minutes in a season: Aleksandrs Jerofejevs, 68 (2019–20)

Notable players
 Miķelis Rēdlihs
 Georgijs Pujacs
 Aleksandrs Jerofejevs

References

External links
 

Ice hockey clubs established in 2018
Latvian Hockey League teams
2018 establishments in Latvia
Sport in Riga
Ice hockey teams in Latvia